Theresa Merritt Hines (September 24, 1922 June 12, 1998), known professionally as Theresa Merritt, was an American actress and singer. She's known for her role in That's My Mama (1974-1975) and for her film roles in The Wiz (1978) and Billy Madison (1995).

Career
Born in Emporia, Virginia, Merritt appeared in many theatrical productions but gained fame later in life when she starred as Ma Rainey in Ma Rainey's Black Bottom, for which she earned a Tony Award nomination, and The Wiz, in which she replaced Mabel King as Evillene. She left The Wiz, citing the role's harmful effect on her voice. She then starred in the television sitcom That's My Mama.

Merritt's other Broadway credits included Mule Bone (1991), Division Street (1980), Don't Play Us Cheap! (1972), The Crucible (1972), Trumpets of the Lord (1969),  Golden Boy (1964), Tambourines to Glory (1963), and Carmen Jones (1943, 1945, 1947). She also toured with road companies of Funny Girl, Show Boat, and South Pacific.

Her most notable film roles were Aunt Em in the 1978 film version of The Wiz, Mrs. Crosby in the 1977 film adaptation of Neil Simon's The Goodbye Girl, and Juanita in the Adam Sandler comedy Billy Madison. She also appeared alongside Burt Reynolds and Dolly Parton in the film adaptation of The Best Little Whorehouse in Texas.

Personal life and death
Merritt was married to Benjamin Hines, and they had four children. During the 34th National Convention of Delta Sigma Theta sorority, Merritt and E. Fannie Granton of Jet magazine were made honorary members of the sorority in 1977. Merritt died of skin cancer on June 12, 1998, in New York City in the Bronx.

Filmography

Awards and nominations

References

External links
 
 
 
 
 

1922 births
1998 deaths
People from Emporia, Virginia
Actresses from Virginia
American stage actresses
American television actresses
Deaths from cancer in New York (state)
Deaths from skin cancer
African-American actresses
American film actresses
20th-century American actresses
Delta Sigma Theta members
20th-century American singers
20th-century African-American women singers